Mark Stephen Hill (born 21 January 1961) is an English retired professional football left back, best remembered for his five years in non-league football with Maidstone United. Earlier in his career, he played in the Football League for Brentford.

Playing career

Queens Park Rangers 
A left back, Hill began his youth career with Queens Park Rangers and signed a professional contract at the end of the 1978–79 season. Despite Rangers' relegation to the Second Division, he failed to make a first team appearance during the 1979–80 season and departed Loftus Road at the end of the campaign.

Brentford 
Hill joined Third Division club Brentford in July 1980, as one of new manager Fred Callaghan's first signings. Aged only 19, Hill held a regular place in the first team during the 1980–81 season and made 42 appearances, scoring three goals. He scored on his debut versus Charlton Athletic and scored one goal for and against the Bees in front of the ATV cameras during a 3–2 win at Walsall a fortnight later. Hill fell out of favour in the following season and made just 20 appearances before his release in June 1982. He made 62 appearances and scored three goals during his two seasons at Griffin Park.

Wycombe Wanderers 
Hill dropped into non-league football to sign for Isthmian League Premier Division club Wycombe Wanderers during the 1983 off-season. He had an excellent start to life at Loakes Park, making 42 league appearances, reaching the first round proper of the FA Cup, the final of the Isthmian League Cup and winning the first silverware of his career as the Chairboys cruised to the 1982–83 Premier Division title. The club declined a place in the Alliance Premier League and Hill remained with the Chairboys until the end of the 1983–84 season. He made 68 league appearances and scored three goals during his two seasons with the club.

Maidstone United 
Hill signed for Alliance Premier League champions Maidstone United during the 1984 off-season. He was a regular pick during a five-year spell with the club and in the 1988–89 season was part of the team which won the Kent Senior Cup and finished top of the renamed Football Conference, which secured promotion to the Football League for the first time in the club's history. With the club going full-time for the 1989–90 season in the Football League, Hill left the club in order to remain part-time. He made over 200 appearances during his five years with Maidstone United.

Slough Town 
Hill dropped to the Isthmian League Premier Division to sign for Slough Town during the 1989 off-season. Given the captain's armband, he had an excellent first season, leading the team to the league title and the final of the Berks & Bucks Senior Cup. Hill remained with the Rebels until the end of the 1991–92 season, having made 93 appearances and scored three goals for the club.

Hendon 
Hill returned to the Isthmian League Premier Division to join Hendon during the 1992 off-season. He made 64 appearances and scored one goal in two mid-table seasons for the club.

Later years 
Hill ended his career with spells at Isthmian League clubs Wealdstone and Walton & Hersham. He served Walton & Hersham in, at different times, the roles of player, assistant manager and joint-caretaker manager.

Personal life 
Hill spent 12 years working for Akai and as of 2012, had spent the previous 17 years working for LG Electronics in Slough, Berkshire. As of 2014, his son Lucas was a member of Wycombe Wanderers' development centre.

Honours 
Wycombe Wanderers
Isthmian League Premier Division: 1982–83
Maidstone United
 Football Conference: 1988–89
 Kent Senior Cup: 1988–89
Slough Town
 Isthmian League Premier Division: 1989–90

Career statistics

References 

1961 births
People from Perivale
Footballers from the London Borough of Ealing
English footballers
Brentford F.C. players
English Football League players
Queens Park Rangers F.C. players
Wycombe Wanderers F.C. players
Maidstone United F.C. (1897) players
Association football fullbacks
Slough Town F.C. players
Hendon F.C. players
National League (English football) players
Isthmian League players
Living people
Walton & Hersham F.C. players
Walton & Hersham F.C. managers
Isthmian League managers
Wealdstone F.C. players
English football managers